Yahya Assiri is a Saudi Arabian human rights activist and former member of the Royal Saudi Air Force.

Early life and career 
Assiri was born in 1980 in Abha, Asir Province, a region in south-west Saudi Arabia. He joined the Royal Saudi Air Force when he was 18 and eventually became responsible for weapons purchases. Assiri received his master's degree in Human Rights and Political Communications from Kingston University and has a bachelor's degree in Administration.

Political and human rights activism 
Assiri described his human rights concerns starting with the worries of air force colleagues who felt that their salaries were unfairly low in comparison to the wealth of members of the Saudi royal family. Assiri started becoming involved in online political forums in 2004. In 2006 he attended five or six public forums organised by Saud al-Hashimi in Jeddah, in which guests included the Palestinian Khaled Mashal and the Tunisian Rached Ghannouchi. He became involved in protests during an air force training period in London beginning in 2009. At the end of this period, he returned to Saudi Arabia but had difficulty finding work.

Political asylum 
In 2013, Assiri returned to London to study human rights at Kingston University. In 2014, worried by the arrests of Abdullah al-Hamid and Mohammad Fahad al-Qahtani of the Saudi Civil and Political Rights Association and the long prison sentences that they received and by news from his colleagues that he would most likely be imprisoned if he returned to Saudi Arabia, he applied for political asylum in the United Kingdom. Assiri founded Al Qst (or ALQST), a human rights organisation, in August 2014. In 2015, he expressed concern that British authorities might have been delaying his request for political asylum in order to force him and his family to return to Saudi Arabia. In early 2017 he and his family were granted asylum with refugee status in the United Kingdom.

Cybercrime target 
In 2018, Assiri, together with other Saudi opposition members, like Ghanem Almasarir, were the target of cybercrime attempts. Their phones were targeted by the Pegasus spyware, with suspicions that the Saudi authorities were responsible.

See also
Walid Fitaihi

References

External links
 
 
 
 
 Yahya Assiri testimonial for Waleed
 
 
 
 Yahya Assiri: The Saudi Regime Must Change or It Must Go-ELLIOT FRIEDLAND

1980 births
Saudi Arabian human rights activists
Living people
People from Abha
Alumni of Kingston University
Saudi Arabian expatriates in the United Kingdom
Saudi Arabian dissidents